The  is a major railway line operated by the Kyushu Railway Company (JR Kyushu) between Mojikō in Kitakyushu, and Kagoshima Station in Kagoshima City, at the southern end of Kyushu. Until March 13, 2004, it extended 393 km between its two termini; however, with the opening of the Kyushu Shinkansen on March 13, the section between Yatsushiro and Sendai was transferred to the third-sector Hisatsu Orange Railway Company. The line is an important line in Kyushu, connecting Fukuoka (Hakata Station) to many other major cities. It is the main line through the Fukuoka urban district, and as such many long-distance express trains from all parts of Kyushu use the section between Kokura Station (Kitakyushu) and Tosu Station, where the Nagasaki Main Line meets the Kagoshima Main Line.

Stations

Mojikō – Arao

Arao – Yatsushiro

Sendai – Kagoshima

Footnotes

Former Yatsushiro – Sendai section
This section was transferred to the Hisatsu Orange Railway Line from March 13, 2004. Some through services operate over this section.

Yatsushiro - Higo-Kōda - Hinagu (Hinagu-Onsen) - Higo-Futami - Kami-Tanoura - (Tanoura-Otachimisaki-Kōen) - Higo-Tanoura - Uminoura - Sashiki - Yunoura - Tsunagi - (Shin-Minamata) - Minamata - Fukuro - Komenotsu - Izumi - Nishi-Izumi - Takaono - Nodagō - Origuchi - Akune - Ushinohama - Satsuma-Ōkawa - Nishikata - Satsuma-Taki - Kusamichi - Kami-Sendai - Sendai

Names in brackets are stations newly built or renamed after the line was transferred.

History

The Kyushu Railway opened the 197 km Mojiko - Hakata - Kumamoto section between 1889 and 1891, extended the line south to Yatsushiro by 1896 and the company was nationalised in 1907.

At the southern end the line from Kagoshima to Hayato (now part of the Nippo Main Line) opened as part of the Hisatsu Line in 1901. The Hayato to Yoshimatsu section of the Hisatsu line opened in 1903, the Yatsushiro to Hitoyoshi section opened in 1908, and the Hitoyoshi to Yoshimatsu section in 1909, providing the original connection from Kagoshima to Yatsushiro.

The Kagoshima to Sendai line opened between 1913 and 1914, and the Sendai to Yatsushiro section opened between 1922 and 1927, at which time this route replaced the Hisatsu Line to become the southern part of the Kagoshima Main Line.

In 2004, following the opening of the Kagoshima to Shin-Yatsushiro section of the Kyushu Shinkansen, the Yatsushiro to Sendai section was transferred to the third-sector Hisatsu Orange Railway.

Duplication
The Moji to Kokura section was double-tracked in 1897. The 14 km Kokura to Kurosaki section (on a new alignment to the west of the original line) opened in 1908, and was completed to Hakata by 1913. The line was double-tracked south of Hakata to Tosu between 1917 and 1921, with Tosu to Hizen Asahi opening 1934, and to Kurume in 1942.

The next section to Araki was double-tracked in 1961, to Kumamoto in 1968 and Yatsushiro in 1970. The Yunoura to Tsunagi section was double-tracked between 1966 and 1968. The line was double-tracked from Kagoshima to Higashichiki between 1969 and 1980.

Former connecting lines
The original Kokura to Kurosaki alignment avoided the coastline due to the Japanese army expressing concern at the vulnerability of a coastal route to enemy naval gunfire. A 3 km "Kokura Bypass" line (junctioning 2 km north of Kokura) to the Nippo Main Line was opened in 1903 for the same reason. However, following Japan's success in the 1904 Russo-Japanese War, this concern diminished and the Kokura to Kurosaki section was rebuilt (and duplicated) on a new easier (though 3 km longer) alignment to the west of the original line in 1908. The original 11 km section was then renamed the Okura Line and operated until 1911, when it closed together with the Kokura Bypass line.

 Ongagawa Station: An 11 km line to Muroki operated between 1908 and 1985. A 6 km  gauge line to Nishiashiya operated from 1915 to 1932. The Ashiya airfield was occupied by the USAF in 1945, and a  gauge line was built on the formation of the 762 mm gauge line to serve the airfield in 1947. Trains were mixed (i.e. freight wagons with a passenger car attached) and only available to US military personnel until 1950. The Korean War extended the use of the airfield by the USAF, and the line closed in 1961.
 Yoshizuka Station: A 14 km line to Chikuzenkatsuta opened between 1918 and 1919, hauling coal until the mine closed in 1965. The line closed in 1985.
 Futsukaichi Station: A 26 km light railway to Amagi operated between 1908 and 1940.
 Hainuzuka Station: The 20 km Yabe Line to Kuroki opened as a  gauge line in 1903, closing in 1940. The line was rebuilt as a 1,067 mm gauge line in 1945. Freight services ceased in 1978, and the line closed in 1985.
 Setaka Station: A 24 km line to Saga (on the Nagasaki Main Line) opened between 1931 and 1935, and closed in 1987. This line crossed three major watercourses by substantial bridges. The Kyushu Fertiliser Co. operated a 14 km line to Nankan from 1921 until 1938. The 8 km  gauge line to Yanagawa line operated from 1911 until 1932.
 Omuta Station: The Mitsui Mining Co. opened a 19 km line to Miike-ko coal mine in 1891. Two branch lines, 4 and 3 km long, were subsequently opened, closing in 1985 and 1969 respectively. Passenger services ceased in 1984. The majority of the system closed in 1997, when the coal fired power stations at Omuta supplied by the line converted to oil, with a 2 km section to Miyaura freight yard remaining to serve a chemical plant.
 Arao Station: A 5 km line to Midorigaoka, electrified at 500 V DC, operated from 1949 until 1964.
 Ueki Station: A 20 km line to Yamaga operated from 1917 until 1965.
 Kamikumamoto: The 22 km  gauge Kumamoto Light Railway to Otsu opened between 1907 and 1914, with a 2.4 km branch to Suizenji. Despite proposals to regauge the line to  gauge and electrify it, the anticipated development of the area did not occur at an acceptable rate and the line was closed in 1921.
 Minamata Station: The first section of the Yamano line was opened from Kurino (on the Hisatsu Line) 24 km to Yamano in 1921. The 14 km Minamata to Kugino section opened in 1934, and the 10 km Yamano to Satsuma section the following year. In 1937, the 8 km Kugino to Satsuma section, including the Okawa spiral opened. Freight services ceased in 1986, and the line closed in 1988.
 Sendai Station: The Kawamiya Railway commenced construction of a line towards Satsumaoguchi (on the Yamano line) in 1917. Construction was suspended in 1921, and the company was nationalised in 1923. Construction (as the Miyanojo Line) recommenced that year, and the 66 km line opened in stages between 1924 and 1937, closing in 1987.
 Kami Ijuin Station: The Kagoshima Prefectural Government opened a 50 km line to Makurazaki between 1914 and 1931. The JR Ibusuki Makurazaki Line connected when it opened in 1963. The line was closed in 1984 following landslides caused by torrential rain. It had two branch lines: the 16 km Ata to Chiran line opened between 1927 and 1930, and closed by landslides in 1965; and the 3 km Kaseda to Satsuma Man-sei line operated between 1916 and 1962.

References

 
Lines of Kyushu Railway Company
Rail transport in Fukuoka Prefecture
Rail transport in Saga Prefecture
Rail transport in Kumamoto Prefecture
Rail transport in Kagoshima Prefecture
1067 mm gauge railways in Japan